Black Emanuelle (Italian: Emanuelle nera) is a softcore sexploitation film from 1975 directed by Bitto Albertini. This Africa set film was shot mostly in Kenya. The music was composed by Nico Fidenco.
Black Emanuelle was followed by a number of sequels, all revolving around the erotic adventures of Mae Jordan (played by Laura Gemser), a globe-trotting, hedonistic investigative journalist and photographer known to her readers as "Emanuelle". Her character has been described as "a strong and independent woman, sexually proactive, at the centre of wealthy young and old white men of power, and involved in any sort of depraved set and situation."

Plot 
Journalist and photographer Mae Jordan (Laura Gemser) publishes her work under the name Emanuelle. She accepts an assignment from a diplomatic couple in Nairobi, and starts a sexual relationship with both. Together they teach her the ways of the country and love.

Cast
 Laura Gemser (credited as Emanuelle) as Mae "Emanuelle" Jordan
 Karin Schubert as Ann Danieli 
 Angelo Infanti as Gianni Danieli 
 Isabelle Marchall as Gloria Clifton 
 Gabriele Tinti as Richard Clifton 
 Don Powell as Professor Kamau 
 Venantino Venantini as William Meredith

Production

Casting 
According to the account in his memoir, Albertini came across a picture of Gemser at a travel agency while he was shooting in Kenya. Struck by her beauty, he located her agent in Gand (Belgium). Upon travelling there and telling him that he wanted her to star in a film, the agent tried to dissuade him, pointing out that she could hardly pose for a photograph properly, let alone act. Albertini, however, insisted. In the meantime, the producer had called together Angelo Infanti, Karin Schubert and Gabriele Tinti, and they started shooting in Kenya. After a few days, Gemser loosened up and began to act.

Albertini's account omits that Gemser had already appeared in two films: Amore libero - Free Love and Emmanuelle: L'antivierge.

Title 
Black Emanuelle was made to cash in on the success of the French film Emmanuelle with Sylvia Kristel, which was released the year before.

Albertini claims it was he who omitted one m in the name of the lead character, in contrast to the French Emmanuelle character.

It was deliberately omitted to avoid copyright claims.

Release 
One version of this otherwise softcore film contains brief hardcore pornographic inserts.

Box office 
Director Albertini remembers that the film was a huge success. He states that this was also due to the "beautiful costumes" by Adriana Spadaro and to the soundtrack by Nico Fidenco, who Albertini had invited for the job. As Albertini remembers, the soundtrack record Black Emanuelle stayed in the hit parades for a long time.

The Black Emanuelle series 
By 1976 came two Black Emanuelle follow-ups, one in title (Black Emanuelle 2 by Albertini) and one in plot (Emanuelle in Bangkok, a.k.a. Black Emanuelle 2, by Joe D'Amato), also triggering four quasi-sequels from 1977 to 1978 by D'Amato (under the title Emanuelle) and two Emanuelle women in prison films by Bruno Mattei in 1982 and 1983.

Black Emanuelle films by Bitto Albertini 
 Black Emanuelle (1975) (with Laura Gemser).
 Black Emanuelle 2 (a.k.a. The New Black Emanuelle) (1976) (with Shulamith Lasri).

Black Emanuelle 2 differs greatly in plot than the first film, featuring Israeli actress Shulamith Lasri as Emanuelle Richmond, a supermodel going through a state of amnesia and locked in a mental institution in New York. The lead actor, as in the first film, is Angelo Infanti.

Albertini's later movie, Il Mondo dei sensi di Emy Wong (1977, starring Chai Lee) was released as Emanuelle Gialla and Yellow Emanuelle in some markets.

Emanuelle films by Joe D'Amato 
 Emanuelle in Bangkok (1976)
 Emanuelle in America (1977)
 Emanuelle Around the World (1977)
 Emanuelle and the Last Cannibals (1977)
 Emanuelle and the White Slave Trade (1978)

Emanuelle in Bangkok that stars Laura Gemser as the journalist lead character 'Emanuelle' of the first Black Emanuelle film has the original Italian title of Emanuelle nera - Orient Reportage and is considered a genuine sequel directed by Joe D'Amato. The later D'Amato sequels that all have the same lead character but do not use the word nera (black) in their titles are noted to feature scenes of extreme violence and depravity (one controversial scene in Emanuelle in America shows a naked woman masturbating a horse).

Nico Fidenco's music 
Kristopher Spencer calls Fidenco's scores to the Black Emanuelle films "by turns sultry and serious, fun and funky", and describes the instrumentation and sound typical of these soundtracks:

Emanuelle films by Bruno Mattei 
 Violence in a Women's Prison (1982)
 Emanuelle Escapes from Hell (1983)

Four years after the release of the last Emanuelle film by D'Amato, the journalist character 'Emanuelle' played by Laura Gemser was revived by Bruno Mattei in two women in prison films: Violence in a Women's Prison where the real name of the character is given as Laura Kendall and Emanuelle Escapes from Hell (Emanuelle fuga dall'inferno a.k.a. Blade Violent - I violenti). Emanuelle Escapes from Hell was directed by Mattei and Claudio Fragasso under the collective pseudonym Gilbert Roussel.

Uncut versions of several Emanuelle films contain scenes depicting actual penetration. Also Black Emanuelle and Emanuelle Around the World  contain scenes where the Emanuelle character is seen having explicit sex. These scenes were created with hardcore inserts, using a body double. Laura Gemser never performed explicit sexual acts on film, nor was she informed that a body double would be used.

Other films
There are films that star Laura Gemser as a character other than Mae Jordan / Laura Kendall / 'Emanuelle' but that have, at one point or another, been promoted as Emanuelle films, especially in foreign releases. These films included even an earlier film that featured Gemser, Amore libero (1974), which saw a release with the English title "The Real Emanuelle". The name of Gemser's character had often been changed to Emanuelle in the English dubbing of such films.

The Real Emanuelle (Amore Libero - Free Love, 1974), directed by Pier Ludovico Pavoni.
Emmanuelle on Taboo Island (La Spiaggia del desiderio, 1976), directed by Enzo D'Ambrosio & Humberto Morales.
Black Cobra Woman / Emmanuelle Goes Japanese (Eva nera, 1976), directed by Joe D'Amato.
Black Emanuelle, White Emanuelle / Emanuelle In Egypt (Velluto nero, 1976), directed by Brunello Rondi.
Sister Emanuelle (Suor Emanuelle, 1977), directed by Giuseppe Vari.
Emanuelle & the Porno Nights (Le notti porno nel mondo, 1977), directed by Bruno Mattei.
Emanuelle in the Country (L'Infermiera di campagna, 1978), directed by Mario Bianchi.
Emanuelle's Daughter / Emanuelle's Sweet Revenge / Emanuelle: Queen Bitch / Emanuelle, Queen of Sados (I mavri Emmanouella, 1980), directed by Elia Milonakos.
Divine Emanuelle: Love Cult (Die Todesgöttin des Liebescamps, 1981), directed by Christian Anders.
Emanuelle: Queen of the Desert (La Belva dalle calda pelle, 1982), directed by Bruno Fontana.
Emanuelle's Perverse Outburst (Le dechainement pervers de Manuela, 1983), directed by Joe D'Amato. Comprises archive footage from previous Emanuelle films.

Mario Pinzauti's 1976 film Emmanuelle bianca e nera ("White and Black Emmanuelle") was an attempt to capitalise on the success of both Black Emanuelle and Mandingo. The film, starring Malisa Longo (Emmanuelle) and Rita Manna (Judith) also saw theatrical release as Passion Plantation.

References

External links 
 

1975 films
Films directed by Bitto Albertini
Italian sexploitation films
1970s Italian-language films
Spanish erotic films
Films set in Africa
Films shot in Kenya
Emanuelle
Films scored by Nico Fidenco
1970s Italian films
1970s French films